Lieutenant colonel (LtCol) (Övlt) is a field grade officer rank in the Swedish Armed Forces, just above the rank of major and just below the rank of colonel. It is equivalent to the naval rank of commander in the Swedish Navy.

History
Lieutenant colonel denotes the closest below the colonel's regimental officer rank. The term is almost as old as colonel and initially referred to his closest aides. Nowadays, the lieutenant colonel in a regiment in most armies has become the colonel's closest assistant. In Sweden, in peacetime he is sometimes battalion commander; in war as well as during major troop exercises he often commands regiments.

Lieutenant colonels serves as commanding officer of a battalion or second-in-command of a brigade. As staff officers, lieutenant colonels serves as section heads, heads of function or qualified staff officer. Lieutenant colonels belong to skill levels  C (Advanced) or D (Expert).

Rank insignia

Collar patches

Shoulder marks

Air Force

Army

Navy (Amphibious Corps)

Sleeve insignias

Air Force

Army

Navy (Amphibious Corps)

Hats

Epaulette

References

Notes

Print

Military ranks of the Swedish Army
Military ranks of the Swedish Air Force

sv:Överstelöjtnant